Scottsdale may refer to:

 Scottsdale, Arizona, United States
 Scottsdale, Tasmania, Australia
 Scottsdale Reserve, New South Wales, Australia
 A former trim level for the Chevrolet C/K truck used from 1973 to 1998

See also

 
 Scotsdale
 Scottdale (disambiguation)